Hellgrammite may refer to:
Hellgrammite (comics)
Hellgrammite, the larval form of the dobsonfly